Events from the year 2008 in Kuwait.

Incumbents
Emir: Sabah Al-Ahmad Al-Jaber Al-Sabah 
Prime Minister: Nasser Al-Sabah

Events

Deaths

 May 13 - Saad Al-Abdullah Al-Salim Al-Sabah.

Establishments

Al-Watan Daily.

References

 
Kuwait
Kuwait
Years of the 21st century in Kuwait
2000s in Kuwait